Mirko Kokotović (15 April 1913 – 15 November 1988) was a Bosnian/Croatian footballer who played international football for both the Croatian and Royal Yugoslavian national teams.

Club career
He became national champion of the Kingdom of Yugoslavia with Građanski Zagreb in 1937 and 1940.

International career
His international career in the Kingdom lasted from 1931 to 1939 during which he was capped 23 times, scoring four goals. During World War II, he played four matches for the Banovina of Croatia's national team, which represented the Croatian statelet within the kingdom. With the establishment of the Independent State of Croatia, a puppet state of Nazi Germany, and its respective national team, he was capped 12 times, scoring 2 goals.

References

External links
 
Mirko Kokotović at Reprezentacija.rs

1913 births
1988 deaths
People from Lukavac
People from the Condominium of Bosnia and Herzegovina
Association football midfielders
Yugoslav footballers
Yugoslavia international footballers
Croatian footballers
Croatia international footballers
Dual internationalists (football)
HŠK Građanski Zagreb players
GNK Dinamo Zagreb players
Yugoslav First League players
Yugoslav football managers
GNK Dinamo Zagreb managers
NK Lokomotiva Zagreb managers
NK Varaždin managers
HNK Segesta managers
NK Olimpija Ljubljana (1945–2005) managers
FK Borac Banja Luka managers
Fenerbahçe football managers
AEK Athens F.C. managers
Diagoras F.C. managers
FK Velež Mostar managers
FC Kärnten managers
Yugoslav First League managers
Süper Lig managers
Super League Greece managers
Yugoslav expatriate football managers
Expatriate football managers in Turkey
Yugoslav expatriate sportspeople in Turkey
Expatriate football managers in Greece
Yugoslav expatriate sportspeople in Greece
Expatriate football managers in Austria
Yugoslav expatriate sportspeople in Austria